Herbert P. Wilkins served as chief justice of the Massachusetts Supreme Judicial Court from 1996 to 1999, a position his father, Raymond Sanger Wilkins, held from 1956 to 1970.

Wilkins received his B.A. from Harvard College and his law degree from Harvard Law School. He joined the law firm of Palmer and Dodge.

He had the longest tenure of any Associate Justice of the Court (from 1972) when he was nominated Chief Judge by Governor William Weld on July 16, 1996. He retired from the Court on August 31, 1999.

Since retiring from the court, Justice Wilkins has taught at Boston College Law School.

Notes

Living people
Chief Justices of the Massachusetts Supreme Judicial Court
Harvard Law School alumni
Boston College faculty
Harvard College alumni
Year of birth missing (living people)